The ICC Men's T20I Cricketer of the Year is an annual award, established in 2021 by the International Cricket Council to the best Twenty20 International player over the year in question. It is one of the annual ICC Awards. It has succeeded former Twenty20 International Performance of the Year Award, which was awarded to a player based on a single match performance.

Selection
The nominees were shortlisted by the Awards panel, comprising prominent cricket journalists and broadcasters from across the globe along with Geoff Allardice, the ICC's CEO.The Voting Academy, comprising a wider selection of global cricket journalists and broadcasters, voted for their first, second and third choices. The ICC also took into consideration fans’ votes via ICC's digital channels. The result of the Voting Academy selections and the fans’ vote were combined to determine the winner.

List of Winners

See also
 ICC Awards

References

External links

Cricket awards and rankings
Sir Garfield Sobers
Awards established in 2004